The Death of Hercules is a 1634 painting by Francisco de Zurbarán, now in the Museo del Prado in Madrid. It belonged to a series of paintings on the life of Hercules for the Hall of Realms at the Palacio del Buen Retiro.

References

1634 paintings
Paintings by Francisco de Zurbarán in the Museo del Prado
Paintings depicting Heracles